Astragalus atropilosulus is a perennial herb in the legume family. It is native to Africa.

It is used as a vegetable in Malawi and Kenya.

References

External links
 PROTAbase on Astragalus atropilosulus

atropilosulus
Flora of Africa